The Punjab Health Department is a government agency of Punjab, Pakistan that delivers preventive healthcare, as well as curative care health care services from the primary health care level to the tertiary care level.

Statistics 
The Department runs:
 2,461 basic health units 
 293 rural health centers 
 88 Tehsil headquarter hospitals 
 34 district headquarter hospitals
 23 Teaching hospitals/tertiary care hospitals
Pakistan is number 8 out of the 22 most disease burdened countries in the world. 
TB is most common in Pakistan.

Departments

Directorate General Health Services Punjab 
The Directorate is responsible for overseeing the provision of primary and secondary health care services throughout the province.

Directorate General of Nursing 
The functions of the Directorate General of Nursing are: 
 Nursing services
 Nursing education

List of Director Generals

Internal Audit Wing

Punjab Health Foundation 
The Foundation assists and promotes the private sector in providing better grassroots health care.

Attached Institutions

The Children's Hospital and Institute of Child Health

Punjab Pharmacy Council 
The Punjab Pharmacy Council regulates the practice of pharmacy.

Provincial Quality Control Board 
The Provincial Quality Control Board was established under the Drugs Act of 1976, to ensure the availability of quality drugs for the general public.

Autonomous Institutions 
Under the Punjab Medical and Health Institutions Act of 2003, the medical colleges and teaching hospitals have been declared autonomous bodies.

See also 
 Ministry of National Health Services Regulation and Coordination
 Health care in Pakistan
 Ministry of Public Health (Sindh)
 Ministry of Health Balochistan

References

External links
 Health Department

Departments of Government of Punjab, Pakistan
Healthcare in Punjab, Pakistan
Punjab, Pakistan